The 2004 WNBA season was the 5th season for the Indiana Fever. The Fever missed the playoffs due to the strong competitivity in the Eastern Conference. As of the 2010 season, this was the last season Indiana had missed the playoffs.

Offseason

Dispersal Draft
Based on the Fever's 2003 record, they would pick 5th in the Cleveland Rockers dispersal draft. The Fever picked Deanna Jackson.

WNBA Draft

Regular season

Season standings

Season schedule

Player stats

References

Indiana Fever seasons
Indiana
Indiana Fever